
The following lists events that happened during 1820 in South Africa.

Events
 The Zulu king Shaka started extending his kingdom, destroying other tribes along the way.
 James Read produced first SeTswana book
 Andries Waterboer was elected the Griqua captain at Griquatown
 17 March - The first British settlers arrived in Table Bay, Cape Town on the "Nautilus " and the "Chapman"
 1 May - The "Albury" reaches Cape Town bringing settlers to Albany, South Africa. They arrive in Algoa Bay on 15 May.
 2 May - "La Belle Alliance" reached Cape Town. She is brought British settlers to Algoa Bay.
 4000 British settlers started arriving in Algoa Bay (Port Elizabeth), they settled in Grahamstown and along the frontier
 Port Elizabeth named by Sir Rufane Donkin
 The settlement of Worcester established

Births
 Mgolombane Sandile, a Xhosa nation (Rarabe) chief born in the Ciskei region

References
See Years in South Africa for list of references

 
South Africa
Years in South Africa